The 2010 Australian motorcycle Grand Prix was the sixteenth round of the 2010 Grand Prix motorcycle racing season. It took place on the weekend of 15–17 October 2010 at the Phillip Island Grand Prix Circuit. Australian Casey Stoner won his fourth consecutive home race, which was also his last win for Ducati and Ducati's last win until the 2016 Austrian motorcycle Grand Prix.

MotoGP classification

Moto2 classification
Wayne Maxwell was black flagged for dangerous riding, crashing into Héctor Faubel during the first lap.

125 cc classification

Championship standings after the race (MotoGP)
Below are the standings for the top five riders and constructors after round sixteen has concluded.

Riders' Championship standings

Constructors' Championship standings

 Note: Only the top five positions are included for both sets of standings.

References

Australian motorcycle Grand Prix
Australian
Motorcycle
Motorsport at Phillip Island
October 2010 sports events in Australia